Percy Stuart is a German TV series (1969–1972).

Synopsis 
Percy Stuart tried to fulfill his father's last wish by becoming a member of his father's English club and in order to get accepted he has to prove that he is worthy. Since some of the members do not like the idea he is confronted by a number of actually impossible missions. Whenever he fails them once he has start all over again. On his missions he is accompanied and observed by solicitor Reginald Prewster (Horst Keitel) who always eventually has to report to the club how it went.

Protagonist 
Percy Stuart acts very self-confident and venturesome but still he is also a son who respects his fathers wishes. His father on the other hand seems to have offended the ultraconservative members of the Eccentric Club by leaving Merry Old England in order to make a fortune in the New World (and even more by succeeding in doing so). Even though some of the accredited club members act repeatedly downright grumpy, Percy Stuart would always remain nonchalant.

The Eccentric Club 
It is hardly a mere coincidence to find Snyder, Pommeroy and Winterbottom among the names of the members. Their names are familiar to many Germans thanks to the comedy sketch Dinner For One and were so already back then. When the series about Percy Stuart started, the very sketch was already that famous in Germany that even after several decades it is still broadcast on every New Year's Eve. To combine cherished clichés about Britons had already been a formula for the success of the many German Edgar Wallace feature films.

Cast of the Eccentric Club

Comparisons 
Due to the typical content of the show, which included a great deal of action, Percy Stuart acquired the nickname "The German James Bond".

Literary source 
The character of Percy Stuart was created for the dime novel series Lord Percy vom Excentric Club. Der Held und kühne Abenteurer in 197 geheimnisvollen Aufgaben ("Lord Percy of the Excentric Club. The Hero and Daring Adventurer in 197 Mysterious Tasks"), which was published from 1913 to 1916. The series described his colourful efforts to become accepted as member of a lodge called the "Excentric Club", which consisted of high-ranking military officers and civil servants and other influential members of the British upper class. Percy Stuart was the glorification of the British gentleman and his missions could sometimes be described as one-man raids. At the outset of WWI, Percy Stuart was changed into an American millionaire. When the USA started supporting the UK, the government prohibited further publication, ending the series with issue 131.

Beginning in 1920, the series was republished under the title Der neue Excentric-Club - Spannende Sport-Geschichten ("The New Excentric Club - Exciting Sports Stories"). The success led to the series being continued with new stories, ending with issue 534. A 1950 attempt at reissuing the series in 1950 ended after a single issue.

Anglophile German TV audience 
The TV show about Percy Stuart was very much a brainchild of the German zeitgeist of that time. Other films and TV shows featuring Anglo-Saxon protagonists had been very successful. Germany's popular actor Heinz Rühmann had already played Dr. Watson once and Father Brown even twice. Also very profitable was a German series of 32 feature films which were produced by Rialto and were all based on Edgar Wallace's novels. On TV the series The Avengers or "With umbrella, charme and bowler hat" (which is the translation of the German title "Mit Schirm, Charme und Melone") was perceived with enthusiasm, had countless re-runs and is celebrated till today. Shows like The Saint (in Germany: "Simon Templar") or Danger Man (in Germany: "John Drake") also found their audience. German TV had also had such a remarkable success by adapting various books of Francis Durbridge that each mini-series after Durbridge was called a "Straßenfeger" (street-emptier) because there would not be anybody left in the streets when they were broadcast.

Becoming a TV legend 
After 52 episodes which were often physically demanding even for the athletically skilled Claus Wilcke and which moreover had to be produced within tight schemes and budgets, its cherished star Claus Wilcke turned his back on the increasingly more violent show, decided successfully to return to stage acting, founded a family and worked later also successfully as a voice-over actor (which is in Germany, where people are used to dubbed TV shows, a highly respected profession). Besides all that he is a popular guest star for current TV series. His co-star Horst Keitel (not related to Harvey Keitel ) acted a little later in a similar TV show called "Im Auftrag von Madame" ("By Order Of Madame") and Butler Parker, another successful pulp fiction protagonist, also entered the TV screen (1972–73) but at last it was evidently proven that the TV show "Percy Stuart" and its success had been sui generis.

DVD release 
In 2009 a long-awaited restored version of this series, which had had so many re-runs, was finally published. The DVD collection is enriched by documentaries and interviews.

External links 
 

Crime drama television series
Television shows based on German novels
German drama television series
German action television series
1960s German television series
1969 German television series debuts
1972 German television series endings
German-language television shows
Television shows set in the United Kingdom
ZDF original programming